Tameem Al-Muhaza (Arabic:تميم المهيزع) (born 21 July 1996) is a Qatari footballer. He currently plays for Al-Khor on loan from Al-Gharafa.

Career
In 2014, he was playing for Atlético Madrid's youth teams. He was loaned out to ASPIRE-owned Spanish club Cultural Leonesa in November 2015.

External links

References

Qatari footballers
1996 births
Living people
Qatari expatriate footballers
Al-Gharafa SC players
Cultural Leonesa footballers
Al-Khor SC players
Aspire Academy (Qatar) players
Qatar Stars League players
Association football defenders
Footballers at the 2018 Asian Games
2019 AFC Asian Cup players
AFC Asian Cup-winning players
Asian Games competitors for Qatar
Expatriate footballers in Spain
Qatari expatriate sportspeople in Spain
Qatar international footballers
Qatar youth international footballers
Qatar under-20 international footballers